The 2020–21 Montana State Bobcats men's basketball team represented Montana State University in the 2020–21 NCAA Division I men's basketball season. The Bobcats, led by second-year head coach Danny Sprinkle, played their home games at Brick Breeden Fieldhouse in Bozeman, Montana as members of the Big Sky Conference. In a season limited due to the ongoing COVID-19 pandemic, they finished the season 13–10, 8–6 in Big Sky play to finish in a tie for fourth place. They defeated Idaho State and Southern Utah before losing to Eastern Washington in the championship of the Big Sky tournament.

Previous season
The Bobcats finished the 2019–20 season 16–15, 10–10 in Big Sky play to finish in a tie for fifth place. They received the #5 seed in the Big Sky tournament, and were slated to go up against the #4 seed Portland State in the quarterfinals, but the tournament was cancelled due to the ongoing COVID-19 pandemic.

Roster

Schedule and results

|-
!colspan=12 style=| Regular season

|-
!colspan=12 style=| Big Sky tournament
|-

|-

Source

References

Montana State Bobcats men's basketball seasons
Montana State Bobcats
Montana State Bobcats men's basketball
Montana State Bobcats men's basketball